Kasilag Pass (‘Kasilashki Prohod’ \'ka-si-lash-ki 'pro-hod\) is an ice-covered saddle of elevation  in the Ellsworth Mountains of Antarctica. It is situated west of Mount Mullen, separates Petvar Heights to the east from Owen Ridge, the southernmost portion of the main crest of  Sentinel Range to the west, and is part of the glacial divide between Kornicker Glacier to the north and Wessbecher Glacier to the south.

The feature is named after the settlement of Kasilag in Western Bulgaria.

Location

Maps
 Vinson Massif.  Scale 1:250 000 topographic map.  Reston, Virginia: US Geological Survey, 1988.

Notes

References
 Kasilag Pass: SCAR Composite Antarctic Gazetteer.
 Bulgarian Antarctic Gazetteer. Antarctic Place-names Commission. (details in Bulgarian, basic data in English)

External links
 Kasilag Pass. Copernix satellite image

Mountain passes of Ellsworth Land
Bulgaria and the Antarctic